Sir Josiah William Hort, 2nd Baronet (6 July 1791 – 24 August 1876) of Hortland, County Kildare, Ireland was a High Sheriff of Kildare and a Member of the Parliament of the United Kingdom.

Early life
He was born the eldest son of Sir John Hort, 1st Baronet and educated at Westminster School and Trinity College, Cambridge (1809).

Political life
He succeeded his father as a minor in 1807 and became the ward of Lord Henry Petty, later the 3rd Marquess of Lansdowne

He was appointed High Sheriff of Kildare for 1818–19 and was elected MP for Kildare in 1831, sitting for only one year before coming in third place in the 1832 election. He was succeeded by his eldest son Sir John Josiah Hort, 3rd Baronet, an army officer.

Death
He died in 1876.

Family
He had married in 1823 Louisa Georgiana, the daughter and coheiress of Sir John Caldwell, 5th Baronet, of Castle Caldwell, County Fermanagh. They had 3 sons and 2 daughters.

References

|-

1791 births
1876 deaths
People educated at Westminster School, London
Alumni of Trinity College, Cambridge
Baronets in the Baronetage of Great Britain
High Sheriffs of Kildare
Members of the Parliament of the United Kingdom for County Kildare constituencies (1801–1922)
UK MPs 1831–1832